WCZY-FM (104.3) is a radio station located in Mt. Pleasant, Michigan. Specializing in adult hits music, the station has been on the air since 1991.

On weekday mornings, WCZY regularly airs "That Show with Tina and Shawn."

History

Beginnings

The history of WCZY can be traced back to October 2 1986, when the construction permit to build the station was first granted. 

The call letters initially assigned to the station in 1989 were WMMI, to mirror that of its daytime-only AM sister station. However, these call letters would never be used, with the call letters changing to WCZY by the end of the year.

The WCZY call letters had belonged to a heritage easy listening radio station in Detroit known today as CHR formatted Channel 955.  That station, known then as "Cozy FM", was a rating powerhouse in its heyday. Like many other easy-listening stations in the mid-1980s, it had moved away from its successful format once ratings began dropping, and then abandoned this moniker (as well as the call letters) altogether by 1986.

Upon this change, it was decided that the new FM station would become an easy listening station, catering to the more affluent listeners of north-central Michigan.  More specifically, those traveling up north from downstate on weekends and the more educated, professional crowd at Central Michigan University, one of the largest colleges in Michigan and Mount Pleasant's largest employer at the time.

Debut as Cozy 104.3

Due to delays brought on by a sudden change in ownership in 1988, WCZY finally went on air on August 20, 1991, with its intended easy listening format, provided jointly by Englewood, Colorado-based syndicator Jones Radio Network, and Salt Lake City-based Bonneville Broadcasting.  

The DJ less, satellite-delivered format promised the "elimination of mindless DJ chatter" as well as fewer commercials to bring "more of the best easy listening music".

Format Change to AC

By 1993, a format change was forced when Jones Radio Network ended the easy-listening format partnership with Bonneville Broadcasting, which had merged with Broadcast Programming. This tape-based music format provider had no desire to enter the dwindling easy listening radio programming market.  WCZY then took the cue of many easy-listening stations who had migrated to a soft adult contemporary format while still branding themselves as easy listening, by re-affiliating with Jones' "Soft Hits" light adult contemporary format.

Since then (now under the Westwood One) umbrella), WCZY has transitioned to programming of mainly local origin, and has also dropped its former "Lite Hits" slogan, now IDing as simply "My 104~3". With the change to My 104-3 on April 19, 2011, the station added more 1970s and 1980s classic hits to its music mix, and is now more of an adult hits station than its former adult contemporary sound.

Station Sale
Latitude Media purchased WCZY and AM sister station WMMI in 2013 for $779,000.  The format offerings remain the same.

Sports programming

In addition to standard music programming, WCZY-FM and its sister station WMMI-AM broadcast local high school football, basketball and playoff baseball in the Mid-Michigan area with play-by-play from Chris Spachman. 

The two stations cover Mount Pleasant, Mount Pleasant Sacred Heart, Beal City, and Clare High School athletic events, including a variety of events including football, as well as both boys and girls basketball, and baseball.

Local concerts, events, and other programming

WCZY host several yearly events around mid-Michigan:

Hometown Showdown - "This FREE talent show attracts hundreds at the Isabella County Fairgrounds and features the area's best talent!"

Boo Bash - "Fun, exciting and SAFE indoor trick-or-treating! Held each October inside the ICE Arena & Morey Courts, so kids can show off their adorable costumes."

Under the Big Top - "We teamed up with Mt Pleasant Parks & Rec and Chippewa River District library for a fun-filled day at Finch Fieldhouse on the campus of CMU."

Previously, WCZY was closely associated with Clare Summerfest, the Farwell Lumberjack Festival, the Farwell Labor Day Festival, the Alma Highland Festival, the Shepherd Maple Syrup Festival and a host of other local community events in Isabella, Gratiot and Clare counties, often broadcasting from those locations.

References

Michiguide.com - WCZY-FM History
Broadcasting & Cable Yearbook - 1990
Broadcasting & Cable Yearbook - 1995
Broadcasting & Cable Yearbook - 2000
Broadcasting & Cable Yearbook - 2005
Broadcasting & Cable Yearbook - 2010
FCC Application to sell WMMI and WCZY to Latitude Media

External links
Official Website

CZY-FM
Radio stations established in 1989